Nebria acuta is a species of black coloured ground beetle from Nebriinae subfamily that can be found in Canada and United States, in states like Alaska, California, Oregon, and Washington.

References

Beetles described in 1961
Beetles of North America
Endemic fauna of the United States
acuta